Antonia Okonma  (born 24 July 1982) is a British actress. She is best known for playing the role of Darlene Cake in the ITV series Bad Girls from 2004–2006.

Early life
Okonma was born and raised in London. She was born into a Nigerian Igbo family.

Career
In 2003, Okonma was cast in role of Darlene Cake in the ITV prison drama series Bad Girls, first appearing in the sixth series, which broadcast in 2004. The character of Darlene Cake was of Jamaican origin, which required Okonma to speak with a Jamaican accent. She appeared in the sixth, seventh and eighth series, making her final appearance in the penultimate episode in 2006, when Darlene attempts suicide by setting herself on fire. Although, she is seen to have survived, her fate is left unknown and was not explained in the final episode. Following the conclusion of the sixth series, a behind-the-scenes special, titled Bad Girls: Most Wanted, was broadcast on ITV2 and ranked the top 10 greatest characters as voted for by viewers; Darlene Cake was voted at fourth place. In 2004, Okonma won a Gathering of Africa's Best (GAB) award for Best Newcomer and a Screen Nation award for Best Emerging Talent for her work in Bad Girls.

Following her role on Bad Girls''', Okonma received roles in the British feature films Screaming Blue Murder and Rabbit Fever, and a minor role on the BBC miniseries Moses Jones in 2009.

On stage, Okonma has acted at the Royal Court and the Riverside Studios. She starred in Torn at the Arcola Theatre alongside Brooke Kinsella and Jocelyn Jee Esien. She is currently playing the title role in the production of Iya Ile (The First Wife) at Soho Theatre.

Okonma has also taken part in the reality TV programmes Strictly African Dancing. She also performed as Tina Turner on celebrity Stars in Their Eyes. In late 2007, she was a contestant on the second series of Cirque de Celebrité'' on Sky One.

Personal life
Okonma has a degree in Accounting and Finance from London South Bank University. She trained with the Royal Court's Young People's Theatre for two years.

Filmography

References

External links

In depth audio interview on The Soap Show

1984 births
Living people
Alumni of London South Bank University
British actresses
British television actresses
English people of Igbo descent
Igbo actresses
Black British actresses
Actresses from London
Nigerian people of British descent
British models